Magdalena Rosina Funck (1672–1695) was a German botanical illustrator best known for creating a 1692 collection of watercolor illustrations titled Blumenbuch or Book of Flowers.

Biography 
Magdalena Rosina Heuchelin was born to a prominent Nuremberg family in 1672. Her father, Christian Heuchelin, had moved to the area in 1667 to begin work in politics. Very little is known about Magdalena Funck's personal life or education. She was likely influenced by prominent scientific illustrator Maria Sibylla Merian, who lived nearby in Nuremberg until the mid 1680s. Though Funck's attendance specifically cannot be confirmed, Merian regularly offered drawing lessons to the unmarried daughters of local wealthy elites.

Blumenbuch 
Magdalena Funck completed an extensive botanical compendium featuring 297 watercolor illustrations of flower specimens accompanied by their names written in German in 1692. She titled the collection Blumenbuch and donated the original manuscript to her father's alma mater, the University of Altdorf, as the school was renowned for its botanical gardens. The original Blumenbuch now resides in the United States at Dumbarton Oaks, a research facility in Washington, D.C. An 18th-century artist's copy of the book is housed at the Hunt Institute for Botanical Documentation at Carnegie Mellon University in Pittsburgh, Pennsylvania.

Funck's botanical illustrations were reproduced on Meissen porcelain in 1742.

References 

1672 births
1695 deaths
German botanical artists
Botanical illustrators
Women illustrators
Women watercolorists
Watercolorists